Prasad Institute of Technology (PIT) is in the outskirts of Jaunpur city. It is approved by the All India Council for Technical Education (AICTE), New Delhi, PCI and affiliated to Dr. A.P.J. Abdul Kalam Technical University bearing college code 144 (APJAKTU). PIT was established by  Prasad Educational Trust in 2002. PIT offers courses of B.Tech (CS, IT, EC, EE, ME), B.Pharma, M.Pharm (Pharmacology & Pharmaceutics) and M.B.A.

References 

Engineering colleges in Uttar Pradesh
Universities and colleges in Jaunpur, Uttar Pradesh
Educational institutions established in 2002
2002 establishments in Uttar Pradesh
Dr. A.P.J. Abdul Kalam Technical University